The Camp Springs Formation is a geologic formation in Texas. It preserves fossils dating back to the Triassic period.

See also

 List of fossiliferous stratigraphic units in Texas
 Paleontology in Texas

References
 

Triassic geology of Texas